The RS Spyder (Type 9R6) is a racing car designed by Porsche in conjunction with Penske to compete in Le Mans Prototype Class 2 (LMP2) racing. The car takes its name from the legendary Porsche 550 Spyder of the 1950s (combined with Porsche's common "RennSport" (lit.: racing sports) designation). The car marked Porsche's first return to the top level of sports prototype racing since the firm abandoned its Porsche LMP in 1999.

The RS Spyder made its debut in the final event of the 2005 American Le Mans Series (ALMS) at Laguna Seca winning its class. Since then the RS Spyder has won the ALMS LMP2 Championship in 2006, 2007 and 2008 and took class honours at Le Mans in 2008 and 2009. The outright victory at the 2008 12 Hours of Sebring was the first major victory for Porsche in endurance racing for five years and it was also the first time in 14 years that the non-premier class won the 12 Hours of Sebring overall. Regulation changes for the 2011 season rendered the RS Spyder obsolete but the car has left a legacy in the Porsche 918 Spyder, which uses a development of the RS Spyder's engine and the Porsche 919 Hybrid which carried Porsche's racing program on into the LMP1 category starting in 2014.

Design
The RS Spyder was designed completely in-house by Porsche engineers with help from Penske Racing. The chassis is a rigid carbon fibre monocoque with both the engine and transmission being integral stressed members. The 3.4-litre 90-degree V8 racing engine was designed from scratch as was the six-speed electro-pneumatic sequential gearbox. Braking is via six-piston aluminum monobloc calipers and carbon ceramic discs, mounted on suspension controlled by four-way adjustable spring/damper units activated by pushrods with adjustable torsion-bar springs.

Since its introduction in 2005, the engine, which initially produced , has been developed and modified to meet the changing regulations of both the ALMS and the ACO.

Race results

2005
The RS Spyder made its race debut at the final round of the 2005 American Le Mans Series, the Monterey Sports Car Championship at Mazda Raceway Laguna Seca, entered by Penske Racing and driven by Lucas Luhr and Sascha Maassen from the Porsche Junioren factory team. The sole RS Spyder finished first in class and fifth overall.

2006
During 2006, Penske entered two RS Spyders in the ALMS and won seven class victories including an outright victory at the Mid-Ohio race. This was the first LMP2 victory in a race since 2003 and the first major result for Porsche since the 1998 24 Hours of Le Mans. The results ensure victory for Penske in the LMP2 Championship and also for Sascha Maassen in the drivers' standings.

2007
Dyson Racing joined Penske in the ALMS. 2007 would be the most successful year for the RS Spyder with Penske repeating their outright victory in the ALMS series a further eight times and also securing an additional three class victories. Penske again won the LMP2 class in ALMS and Romain Dumas won the LMP2 Drivers Championship. During the season the RS Spyder won eight races while the Audi R10 TDI from the largest P1 class won only four.

2008
Rule changes increased the RS Spyder's weight to 825 kg and Porsche introduce a new direct injection engine developing . A Penske car driven by Timo Bernhard, Romain Dumas, and Emmanuel Collard, secured the overall victory at the 2008 12 Hours of Sebring, winning it on the 20th anniversary of Porsche's last overall win at the race. Penske had another outright victory at the Utah Grand Prix and also recorded an additional three class wins. At Petit Le Mans a 3rd RS Spyder was entered by Penske in an attempt to lock out the manufacturers' championship against Acura. Penske won both the LMP2 Team and drivers' championship for Timo Bernhard and Romain Dumas. Porsche won the manufacturers' championship by 1 point ahead of Acura.

Danish Team Essex together with Van Merksteijn Motorsport of The Netherlands and Horag Racing of Switzerland participate in the Le Mans Series (LMS) all with 2008-spec RS Spyder. Team Essex and Van Merksteijn also entered the 24 Hours of Le Mans, marking the debut for the RS Spyder at the event. An RS Spyder from Van Merksteijn Motorsport driven by Jeroen Bleekemolen, Peter van Merksteijn and Jos Verstappen, came first in class and 10th overall with the Essex team coming second in class (12th overall). A RS Spyder won its class in every LMS race giving it a 1-2-3 in the LMP2 standing and securing the drivers championship for Jos Verstappen and the Team championship for Van Merksteijn Motorsport.

2009

Penske did not compete in the ALMS in 2009 but Team CytoSport, who had previously competed in LMP1 in 2007, purchased an ex-Dyson Racing RS Spyder and took part in four races with a best result of second in class at Road America.

In LMS, Team Essex only competed in the 1000 km race at Spa taking the class victory and also securing the class victory at Le Mans, finishing 10th overall with Casper Elgaard, Kristian Poulsen and Emmanuel Collard at the wheel. Team Goh also took part in the race with an ex-Van Merksteijn Motorsport car.

2010
CytoSport announced in February 2010 that it would contest the full ALMS in a RS Spyder. It was also announced that Sascha Maassen would join the regular drivers Klaus Graf and Greg Pickett at the longer races at Sebring, Laguna Seca and Road Atlanta. Cytosport used a full-width rear wing for the entire season, unlike arch-rivals Highcroft HPD.  The CytoSport RS Spyder won the LMP2 class at the 12 Hours of Sebring and took their first outright victory at Northeast Grand Prix at Lime Rock. CytoSport continued their winning success by taking outright victory at a shortened race at Mosport. They also finished the season second behind Patrón Highcroft Racing in the championship and Klaus Graf finished second in the drivers' standings.

No RS Spyders were entered in the 2010 24 Hours of Le Mans. The 2011 LMP2 regulations rendered the RS Spyder obsolete due to the costs exceeding the LMP2 budget limit.

Gallery

Race victories

* Bold indicates pole position
* Italic indicates the fastest lap

See also
Porsche racing models
Porsche in motorsport

References

External links

 Official Porsche website
 RS Spyder at official Porsche site (German)
 Penske Racing

Le Mans Prototypes
24 Hours of Le Mans race cars
Sports prototypes
Rs Spyder
Team Penske